Surabhi (Kamadhenu) is a divine bovine-goddess described in Hinduism as the mother of all cows.

Surabhi, Surbhi or Shurbhi may also refer to:

People
 Surabhi Dashputra, Hindi singer
 Surabhi Kamalabai (1913–1977), Telugu film actress
 Surabhi Lakshmi (born 1986), Malayalam film actress
 Surabhi Santhosh, Kannada film actress
 Surbhi Puranik, Tamil and Telugu film actress
 Surbhi Javeri Vyas, Hindi television actress
 Surbhi Jyoti (born 1988), Hindi television actress
 Surbhi Tiwari (born 1981), Hindi television actress
 Surbhi Chandna, Hindi television actress

Arts and media
 Surabhi (film), a 1999 documentary film produced by K. N. T. Sastry
 Surabhi (theatre group), a family theatre group in Hyderabad, Telangana, India
 Surabhi (TV series), an Indian cultural magazine show

Other uses
 Surabhi foundation, an organisation supporting farmers and artisans in rural India
 Surabhi Village, Kadapa District, Andhra Pradesh, India